The Modern Jazz Quartet is an album by American jazz group the Modern Jazz Quartet featuring performances recorded in 1957 and released on the Atlantic label.

Reception
The Allmusic review stated "Despite the unassuming title, this features a fine rendition of "Night in Tunisia" and a standout "Bags Groove".

Track listing
 Medley: "They Say It's Wonderful"/"How Deep Is the Ocean"/"I Don't Stand a Ghost of a Chance With You"/"My Old Flame"/"Body and Soul" (Irving Berlin)/(Berlin)/(Victor Young, Ned Washington, Bing Crosby)/(Sam Coslow, Arthur Johnston)/(Frank Eyton, Johnny Green, Edward Heyman, Robert Sour) - 10:12     
 "Between the Devil and the Deep Blue Sea" (Harold Arlen, Ted Koehler) - 6:51   
 "La Ronde: Drums" (John Lewis) - 2:08   
 "Night in Tunisia (Dizzy Gillespie, Frank Paparelli) - 6:08   
 "Yesterdays" (Jerome Kern, Otto Harbach) - 5:08   
 "Bags' Groove" (Milt Jackson) - 5:41   
 "Baden-Baden" (Jackson, Ray Brown) - 4:03

Personnel
Milt Jackson - vibraphone
John Lewis - piano
Percy Heath - bass
Connie Kay - drums

References

Atlantic Records albums
Modern Jazz Quartet albums
1957 albums
Albums produced by Nesuhi Ertegun